There is a list of chief nuclear negotiators of Iran since 2003.

List of chief negotiators

See also

 Negotiations leading to the Joint Comprehensive Plan of Action
 Negotiations on Iran nuclear deal framework
 Assassination and terrorism in Iran
 Assassination of Iranian nuclear scientists

References

Lists of political office-holders in Iran